The 2008 Finnish League Cup was the 12th season of Finnish second most prestigious cup tournament. The competition started on 25 January 2008 and ended with the Final held on 12 April 2008. The defending champions FC Lahti lost in the semifinals, while last year's runners-up FC Inter eventually won the tournament.

The Cup consisted of two stages. First there was group stage that involved 14 Veikkausliiga teams divided into two groups. Top 4 teams from each group entered the one-legged elimination rounds – quarterfinals, semifinals and the final.

Group stage
Every team played every other team of its group once, either home or away. The matches were played from 25 January to 24 March 2008.

Group 1

Group 2

Knockout stage

Quarter-finals

Semi-finals

Final

External links
 Finnish League Cup on rsssf.com

League Cup
Finnish League Cup
Finnish League Cup